WPKE-FM (103.1 MHz) is a radio station broadcasting a classic rock format. Licensed to Coal Run, Kentucky, United States, the station is currently owned by Lynn Parrish, through licensee Mountain Top Media LLC. It features programming from Compass Media Networks and Premiere Radio Networks.

History

The station went on the air in 1974 as WECL then changed to WRAU on 1990-06-01.  On 1993-12-27, the station changed its call sign to the current WPKE.

Previously, this station was adult contemporary "Mix 103.1".

References

External links

PKE-FM
Pike County, Kentucky
Classic rock radio stations in the United States
Radio stations established in 1974
1974 establishments in Kentucky